Ferreiros may refer to:

 Ferreiros, Pernambuco, a city in Pernambuco, Brazil
 Ferreiros (Amares), a parish located in Amares, Portugal
 Ferreiros (Braga), a parish located in Braga, Portugal
 Ferreiros (Póvoa de Lanhoso), a parish located in Póvoa de Lanhoso, Portugal